DiMaggio is an Italian surname. People with this name include:
 Three American-born brothers who all played in Major League Baseball as center fielders:
 Dom DiMaggio (1917–2009), Boston Red Sox (1940 to 1953)
 Joe DiMaggio (1914–1999), New York Yankees (1936 to 1951), elected to the Hall of Fame
 Vince DiMaggio (1912–1986), several teams (1937 to 1946)
John DiMaggio (born 1968), American voice actor and comedian
Paul DiMaggio (born 1951), American sociologist
Peter DiMaggio, American engineer

Other 
"Enter Mr. DiMaggio", the third episode of the American television series Smash.

See also
3767 DiMaggio, a main-belt asteroid

Italian-language surnames